So This Is Paris is a 1926 American silent comedy film produced and distributed by Warner Bros. and directed by Ernst Lubitsch. It is based on the 1872 stage play Le Reveillon by Henri Meilhac and Ludovic Halévy. It stars Monte Blue and Patsy Ruth Miller. The film is preserved in many archival holdings including the Library of Congress and the Turner Entertainment Company.

Plot 

Paul and Suzanne Giraud are happily married and living in a quiet neighborhood. When Suzanne notices that their new neighbors are expressive dancers in revealing outfits, she demands Paul speak to them about their lack of morality. Paul discovers that the woman is Georgette Lalle, an old flame. Paul does not respond to Georgette's displays of affection and instead introduces himself to her husband, Maurice. Back at home, Paul lies about his meeting with the Lalles, which confuses Suzanne when Maurice returns the visit moments later. Suzanne and Maurice exchange flirtations, which Paul overhears.

Paul is on his way to a secret meeting with Georgette when he is stopped by a police officer for speeding. After insulting the officer, Paul is charged, convicted and sentenced to three days in prison. As Paul dresses up for a night out at the Artists' Ball with Georgette, he convinces Suzanne that he is heading to jail to serve his three-day sentence.

While Paul and Georgette are enjoying themselves and dancing the Charleston, Maurice visits Suzanne and they grow intimate. They are interrupted by a detective, who has come to arrest Paul for failing to serve his sentence. Fearing a scandal, Suzanne convinces Maurice to pose as her husband and he unhappily complies. Meanwhile, she overhears through the radio that Paul and Georgette are the winners of a Charleston contest at the Artists' Ball. Suzanne confronts her drunken husband at the Ball and tells him that, thanks to her, he will not have to go to jail. They reunite.

Cast

Reception 
The film received positive reviews and was voted by The New York Times as one of the ten best films of 1926. The paper's film critic, Mordaunt Hall, wrote that "in So This Is Paris, [Lubitsch's] tour de force is an extraordinarily brilliant conception of an eye full of a Charleston contest, with vibrant kaleidoscopic changes from feet and figures to the omnipotent saxophones. [..] The comedy in this film had, up to that time, kept the audience in constant explosions of laughter, but the startling dissolving scenic effects and varied "shots" elicited a hearty round of applause."

Box office 
According to Warner Bros. records, the film earned $258,000 domestically and $52,000 foreign.

References

External links

 
 
 
 
 Still at silenthollywood.com
 Lobby poster

1926 films
American silent feature films
American films based on plays
Films directed by Ernst Lubitsch
Warner Bros. films
American black-and-white films
Films set in Paris
Silent American comedy films
1926 comedy films
1920s American films